Dolichognatha spinosa, the longjawed orb weavers, is a species of long-jawed orb weaver in the spider family Tetragnathidae. It is found in Panama.

References

Tetragnathidae
Articles created by Qbugbot
Spiders described in 1939